Bohdan Yesyp (born 2 August 1978) is a Ukrainian retired football forward and current football manager.

External links 

 
 

1978 births
Living people
People from Drohobych
Ukrainian footballers
Ukrainian expatriate footballers
Ukrainian Premier League players
Ukrainian First League players
Ukrainian Second League players
Ukrainian Amateur Football Championship players
FC Dynamo-2 Kyiv players
FC Dynamo-3 Kyiv players
FC Karpaty Lviv players
FC Karpaty-2 Lviv players
FC Naftovyk-Ukrnafta Okhtyrka players
FC Hoverla Uzhhorod players
FC Krymteplytsia Molodizhne players
FC Rostov players
FC Zirka Kropyvnytskyi players
FC Zirka-2 Kirovohrad players
PFC Sumy players
FC Olimpik Donetsk players
FC Solli Plyus Kharkiv players
FC Trostianets players
Expatriate footballers in Russia
Russian Premier League players
Ukrainian football managers
Association football forwards
PFC Sumy managers
Sportspeople from Lviv Oblast